The 2017 Suncorp Super Netball season was the inaugural season of the premier netball league in Australia, following the disbanding of the ANZ Championship in 2016. The regular season began on 18 February 2017 and concluded with the Grand Final on 17 June 2017.

Expansion team Sunshine Coast Lightning won the Grand Final, comfortably defeating Giants Netball at the Brisbane Entertainment Centre.

Overview
The season was played over 14 rounds, allowing every team to play each other twice, once at home and once away. The top 4 teams on the standings at the conclusion of the regular season qualified for the finals series. In the first week of the finals series, the 1st ranked team hosted the 2nd ranked team in the major semi-final (with the winner of that match to qualify for the Grand Final) and the 3rd ranked team hosted the 4th ranked team in the minor semi-final (with the loser of that match eliminated). The loser of the major semi-final then hosted the winner of the minor semi-final in the preliminary final. The winner of the major semi-final then hosted the winner of the preliminary final in the Grand Final.

Standings

Regular season
 All times are local; a full list of season results and match statistics can be found here

Round 1

Round 2

Round 3

Round 4

Round 5

Round 6

Round 7

Round 8

Round 9

Round 10

Round 11

Round 12

Round 13

Round 14

Finals series

Major semi-final

Minor semi-final

Preliminary final

Grand Final

 Karla Mostert (Sunshine Coast Lightning) was awarded the Most Valuable Player award in the Grand Final.

Awards

Team of the Week Award

Postseason Awards

Reserves in the Team of the Year: Caitlin Thwaites (Attack Reserve), Serena Guthrie (Mid Court Reserve) and Rebecca Bulley (Defender Reserve)

Team captains and coaches

References

External links
 
 Season results

2017
2017 in Australian netball